Kristian Heinolainen (born 11 May 1999) is a Finnish professional footballer who plays for JS Hercules, as a defender.

Career
Heinolainen played for FC Kontu, KOPSE, KäPa, HJK, TuPS and PKKU on youth leve.

On 4 December 2019 AC Oulu announced, that they had signed Heinolainen from the 2020 season.

On 26 November 2020, he signed with third-tier club JS Hercules for the 2021 season.

References

1999 births
Living people
Finnish footballers
Pallokerho Keski-Uusimaa players
IF Gnistan players
HIFK Fotboll players
Kemi City F.C. players
Turun Palloseura footballers
Salon Palloilijat players
AC Oulu players
Veikkausliiga players
Kakkonen players
Ykkönen players
Association football defenders
JS Hercules players